HKUGA College (HKUGAC) is a secondary school located at No. 9 Nam Fung Road, Wong Chuk Hang, Hong Kong. It was founded in 2006 by the Hong Kong University Graduates Association. The Hong Kong University Graduates Association Education Foundation is a registered non-profit-making organization founded by members of the Hong Kong University Graduates Association, alumni of The University of Hong Kong (HKU), and other members of society. The foundation consists of nearly 200 members and is managed by an elected Executive Committee.

School Emblem
The school emblem is an orange star with a blue wave on its leg and is shaped to look like its dancing. According to the school website, the star stands for:
Leadership and Inspiration
A child dancing with the delight of learning
A new mode of quality education in the new millennium
Dynamics, energy and creativity

School Motto

Strive for Virtue, Quest for Truth 
It means that people all need to hold firm to their ambitions in bringing up esteemed personality and endeavoring in pursuing truth.

Curriculum

Junior Secondary Level (S1 - S3) 
The 8 Key Learning Areas of the curriculum are Chinese Language, English Language, Mathematics, Science, Technology, Life and Society, Technology and living, Humanities, Arts, and Physical Education. The curriculum aims at kindling intellectual curiosity, developing critical thinking and instilling a fascination for cultures and a love of reading. It is complemented by life education and community service which cultivate a sense of individual and social responsibility.

Senior Secondary Level (S4 - S6) 
This is the stage when the school prepares students for tertiary education or work. Students are guided to set goals and excel in their areas of interest and talent. As the world becomes increasingly globalized, young people have to step beyond Hong Kong. The formal and informal curricula ensure that students are well-versed in different cultures and languages, becoming sophisticated individuals at ease in an increasingly globalized market, Chinese nationals who contribute to the world as global citizens.

10th Anniversary 

HKUGAC's 10th Anniversary Open Day celebrations was held on the 5th and 6 December 2015. The school campus was opened to the public. It was estimated that 3000 visitors in total toured the campus. Students performed a lion dance, singing etc. for the visitors in the Opening Ceremony. Also, a musical play named "Extravaganza" was arranged in the Closing Ceremony.

See also
Education in Hong Kong
List of secondary schools in Hong Kong

References

External links

 
 Website of Hong Kong University Graduates Association Education Foundation 

Secondary schools in Hong Kong
Hong Kong Island
Direct Subsidy Scheme schools